Senad Hysenaj (born 17 October 1999) is an Albanian professional footballer who plays as a left-back.

Career statistics

Club

References

1999 births
Living people
Footballers from Shkodër
Albanian footballers
Association football midfielders
Albania youth international footballers
KF Vllaznia Shkodër players
FK Partizani Tirana players
Besa Kavajë players
Kategoria e Dytë players
Kategoria e Parë players